Ulander is a surname. Notable people with the surname include:

Aki Ulander (born 1981), Finnish basketball player
Kristina Ulander (born 1981), Swedish wheelchair curler
Martin Ulander (born 1976), Swedish footballer

See also
Lander (surname)